Farse may refer to:

 Farsa (plural ), a genre of opera
 Farse (band), a five-piece ska-punk band from Birmingham in the West Midlands of England

See also
 Farce, an exaggerated comedy genre
 Farsa (disambiguation)